The 2009 K League Championship was the 13th competition of the K League Championship, and was held to decide the 27th champions of the K League. The top six clubs of the regular season qualified for the championship. The winners of the regular season directly qualified for the final, and second place team qualified for the semi-final. The other four clubs entered the first round, and the winners of the second round advanced to the semi-final. Each match was played as a single match, excluding the final which consisted of two matches. Jeonbuk Hyundai Motors became the champions for the first time by defeating Seongnam Ilhwa Chunma 3–1 on aggregate in the final.

Qualified teams

Bracket

First round

Seoul vs Jeonnam

Seongnam vs Incheon

Second round

Semi-final

Final

First leg

Second leg

Jeonbuk Hyundai Motors won 3–1 on aggregate.

Final table

See also
2009 in South Korean football
2009 K League

External links
News at K League 
Match report at K League 

K League Championship
K